Cupha is a butterfly genus of the family Nymphalidae found in the Indomalayan and the Australasian realms.

The contained species are: 
Cupha arias C. & R. Felder, [1867]
Cupha crameri (Felder, 1860)
Cupha erymanthis (Drury, [1773])
Cupha lampetia (Linnaeus, 1764)
Cupha maeonides (Hewitson, 1859)
Cupha melichrysos (Mathew, 1887)
Cupha myronides Felder, 1860
Cupha prosope (Fabricius, 1775)
Cupha aureus Samson, 1980

References

Corbet A.S., Pendlebury H.M., Eliot J.N. 1992. The Butterflies of the Malay Peninsula (4th edn.) Malayan Nature Society, Kuala Lumpur.
Parsons M. 1999. The Butterflies of Papua New Guinea: Their Systematics and Biology. Academic Press, San Diego.

External links
Images representing Cupha at EOL
Images representing Cupha at Consortium for the Barcode of Life

Vagrantini
Taxa named by Gustaf Johan Billberg
Nymphalidae genera